Onda is an unincorporated community in Valley Township, Washington County, Arkansas, United States. It is located on County Route 29 (Malico Mountain Road) south of Prairie Grove.

References

Unincorporated communities in Washington County, Arkansas
Unincorporated communities in Arkansas